Samantha Futerman (born November 19, 1987) is a South Korean-born American actress, writer, director, and activist. She is known for her supporting role in the drama film Memoirs of a Geisha, set in Japan around World War II. She is also known for her self-made documentary film Twinsters, about how she discovered the identical twin sister she was not aware she had through Facebook and their journey after the truth is revealed.

Personal life
Futerman was born in Busan, South Korea and given the name Ra-Hee Chung. She was later adopted by American parents, Jackie and Judd Futerman, and has two brothers, Matt and Andrew. Raised in Verona, New Jersey, Futerman graduated from Verona High School in 2005. Afterward, she went to Boston University's College of Fine Arts and received her Bachelor of Fine Arts. In 2011, Futerman moved to Los Angeles to pursue her interest in acting. In 2012, Futerman made an appearance in KevJumba's YouTube video, High School Virgin. After coming across this video, Futerman's identical twin sister, Anaïs Bordier, from whom she had been separated at birth and of whom she had no knowledge, contacted Futerman through Facebook on February 21, 2013. Immediately after, Futerman decided to work with co-director Ryan Miyamoto to document the twins' journey. With the help of Dr. Nancy Segal, the women took a DNA test, which confirmed that Futerman and Anaïs are, in fact, twins. In May 2013, the women met in person for the first time when Futerman decided to visit Anaïs at school in London.

The two sisters have made a documentary film about their lives called Twinsters, which debuted on March 15, 2015, at the South by Southwest Film Festival. The film begins with the women’s first Skype conversation and moves on to them meeting each other in person and their trip to the adoptee conference in Seoul, South Korea, where they also meet their foster mothers.

Since meeting her sister, Futerman has been advocating for adoption. She worked with Jenna Ushkowitz to co-found the Kindred: Foundation of Adoption.

On March 19, 2022, Futerman married Ryan Miyamoto, who co-directed the film Twinsters with her, at a ceremony held in New York City.

Career
At the age of 16, Futerman made her feature film debut in 2005 with the leading role in The Motel. That same year, Futerman received her role in the movie Memoirs of a Geisha, for which she gained international attention with her role of Satsu. In early 2007, Futerman had a supporting role in Dear Lemon Lima opposite Meaghan Martin and Academy Award winner Melissa Leo. Futerman is also known for roles in Going the Distance and 21 & Over.

Filmography

Bibliography
Separated @ Birth: A True Love Story of Twin Sisters Reunited, with Anaïs Bordier, G. P. Putnam's Sons, 2014

References

External links

1987 births
21st-century American actresses
American adoptees
South Korean adoptees
American film actresses
American actresses of Korean descent
American television actresses
Living people
American twins
People from Busan
Identical twin females
People from Verona, New Jersey
Verona High School (New Jersey) alumni